A by-election was held for the New South Wales Legislative Assembly electorate of West Sydney on 30 October 1863 because Geoffrey Eagar had been appointed Colonial Treasurer in the first Martin ministry. Such ministerial by-elections were usually uncontested and on this occasion, Peter Faucett (Yass), William Forster (East Sydney) and Arthur Holroyd (Parramatta) were unopposed. The  other minister Bowie Wilson (Goldfields South) was easily re-elected, with more than 90% of the vote. James Martin had replaced Charles Cowper as Premier and Charles Cowper Jr. resigned his seat of The Tumut to challenge Martin at the Orange by-election. While defeated, Martin promptly returned to parliament, winning the by-election for The Tumut, the seat vacated by Charles Cowper Jr.

Jabex Bunting was a one time candidate. At the declaration of the Poll Eager attributed Bunting's opposition to personal animosity because of a dispute about a claim for expenses of £2 said to have been incurred in the election in January 1863.

Dates

Result

Geoffrey Eagar had been appointed Colonial Treasurer in the first Martin ministry.

See also
Electoral results for the district of West Sydney
List of New South Wales state by-elections

References

1863 elections in Australia
New South Wales state by-elections
1860s in New South Wales